Balaraba Aliyu Inuwa is the commissioner of Public Works and Infrastructure for Kaduna State, Nigeria. She was appointed by Nasir Ahmad el-Rufai.

Education 
She studied architecture at Ahmadu Bello University. She graduated in 1983.

Career 
She is a Yoruba architect. Inuwa was appointed commissioner for Public Works and Infrastructure by Nasir Ahmad el-Rufai. She described the engagement of societies with government as disappointing, and called the attention of civil societies by saying "Civil societies are key stakeholders in governance; in theory they are representative of people, so for the purpose of sustainability, transparency and accountability, they have a role to play in the implementation of government policies and programs. I think with processes like this one, they can come together and build network, coalition and build their capacities in order to engage effectively with government. As representative of the people, they can mobilize people at community level to engage properly with government; they can keep tab of projects that are happening even when a government is gone."

Aliyu was the Special Adviser to the Governor on rural and community development. Aliyu has been actively leading the government agenda for rural and community development. Aluya has been putting efforts to identify most marginalized communities in Kaduna state and develop them and also coordinate the design and delivery of the Kaduna Rural Development Program(KRDP). She has been constantly advising the government on localizing the Development Goals and coming up with ways of combating poverty at community level. Aliyu has worked at Earth Institute as the Deputy Programme Director and Education Specialist in Columbia University in Abuja, Nigeria.

References

External links 
 Ministry for Rural and Community Development – Kaduna State Government

Living people
Hausa people
People from Kaduna State
Ahmadu Bello University alumni
Year of birth missing (living people)